McElwee is a surname. Notable people with the surname include:

Andrew McElwee (died 1968), British trade unionist and politician
Bob McElwee (born 1935), American football official
Carol McElwee, American politician
Enid McElwee (1914–2001), New Zealand fencer
George McElwee (1879-?), Australian politician
Joshua J. McElwee, American journalist
Lee McElwee (1894–1957), American baseball player
Rob McElwee (born 1961), English weather forecaster
Ross McElwee (born 1947), American documentary filmmaker
Samuel A. McElwee (1857–1914), American slave and lawyer
Thomas McElwee (1957–1981), Irish Republican Army member
William McElwee Miller (1892–1993), American missionary

See also
Lisa McElwee-White, American chemist